Johannes Driesch (21 November 1901, Krefeld - 18 February 1930, Erfurt) was a German painter, graphic artist, ceramicist and book cover designer. His favorite subjects were his wife, Lydia, and their children.

Biography 
He came from a large working-class family and began his career as an apprentice stonemason in Krefeld, then spent three semesters at the Kunstgewerbeschule there. Then, in 1919, he enrolled in the preparatory courses at the Staatliche Bauhaus in Weimar, where he studied with Johannes Itten andi Lyonel Feininger.

In 1920, he went to the pottery workshop at the Bauhaus in Dornburg. His primary instructors there were Gerhard Marcks and Max Krehan. The following year, he married Lydia Foucar (1895-1980), a prospective student whom he had met in Munich the year before. They had four children together, which brought their studies to an early finish, as they had to establish a family business to provide income.

In 1922, he gave up pottery and became a free-lance artist, with the support of Marcks and the art historian, . He then continued his studies by himself, copying the Old Masters. After a futile attempt to obtain a Professorship in Düsseldorf, he and his family relocated to Frankfurt am Main in 1928 and opened a studio there. He died two years later, following a brief illness, while working on a commission in Erfurt.

Most of his works were confiscated by the Nazi government in 1935, after they were classified as "degenerate art".

References

Further reading 
 
 Cornelia Nowak, Michael Siebenbrodt (Eds.): Johannes Driesch – Vom Bauhaus nach Arkadien. Exhibition catalog, Kunstsammlungen zu Weimar/Bauhaus-Museum (2001) 
 Klaus Weber, Daniela Sannwald (Eds.): Keramik und Bauhaus. Geschichte und Wirkungen der keramischen Werkstatt des Bauhauses. Exhibition catalog. Berlin : Kupfergraben, 1989

External links 

 
 

1901 births
1930 deaths
20th-century German painters
20th-century German male artists
German ceramists
German graphic designers
People from Krefeld